Electronically Tested is the second album by the British rock band Mungo Jerry, released in March 1971.

Release
The UK version was issued on Dawn Records, and it appeared with slightly different track listings in other countries, as many territories outside the UK had already added the group's debut single and first hit, "In the Summertime", to the running order on the first album of the band: the eponymous Mungo Jerry. All songs were written by the group's frontman Ray Dorset, apart from an extended version of the Willie Dixon blues standard "I Just Want to Make Love to You". In some other states, pressings included the Paul King song, "Black Bubonic Plague", and the album was also retitled as Memoirs of a Stockbroker, because the UK title, taken from an advertisement for contraceptives, was deemed too risqué. In more other countries the release was also called Baby Jump (Electronically Tested), with an alternate track sequence.

It peaked in the UK album charts at No. 13.

Recent reissues on CD have included bonus tracks featuring songs from the maxi-singles that did not appear on album at the time.

Ray "Bizz" Bissiker, who guested on recorder, was also the group's roadie.

The titles comes from a guarantee on a packet of Durex condoms.

Track listing
All songs written by Ray Dorset, except where noted.

"She Rowed" – 3:15
"I Just Wanna Make Love to You" (Willie Dixon) – 9:01
"In the Summertime" – 3:30
"Somebody Stole My Wife" – 2:53
"Baby Jump" – 4:09
"Follow Me Down" – 3:17
"Memoirs of a Stockbroker" – 4:00
"You Better Leave That Whisky Alone" – 3:55
"Coming Back to You When the Time Comes" – 3:38

Personnel
Ray Dorset – lead vocals, electric and 6 and 12-string acoustic guitars, harmonica, kazoo, stomp, tambourine
Paul King – vocals, 6 and 12-string acoustic guitars, harmonica, banjo guitar, jug, recorder
Colin Earl – piano
John Godfrey – bass
Ray Bissiker – recorder
Roger Earl – drums on "Memoirs of a Stockbroker"

References

External links
 

1971 albums
Mungo Jerry albums
Dawn Records albums